Sigmoidal or sigmoid, literally means S-shaped and can refer to:

 Sigmoid function
 Sigmoidal artery
 Sigmoid colon